Farzana Islam (born 1957) is a Bangladeshi academic. She is a former vice-chancellor of Jahangirnagar University during 2014-2022. In 2014, she became the first female vice-chancellor of a public university in Bangladesh. She allegedly accused of different irregularities and corruption by both Students and Teachers. They also published a book. The 224-page book features reports on different irregularities and corruptions published in different newspapers.

Education and career
Islam completed her master's degree in sociology from the University of Dhaka in 1980. She then joined Chittagong University as a lecturer of the Department of Sociology in 1982. In 1986, she joined the Department of Anthropology of Jahangirnagar University. She earned her Ph.D. degree from the University of Sussex in 2001.

In March 2014, President of Bangladesh, Abdul Hamid, appointed Islam as the vice-chancellor of Jahangirnagar University. Farzana Islam made AL Advisory Council members at Awami League’s 22nd national council.

Awards
 Anannya Top Ten Awards (2014)

References

1957 births
Living people
Bangladeshi women academics
University of Dhaka alumni
Alumni of the University of Sussex
Vice-Chancellors of Jahangirnagar University
Women academic administrators
Bangladeshi academic administrators
People from Shariatpur District